Decoration may refer to:
 Decorative arts 
 A house painter and decorator's craft
 An act or object intended to increase the beauty of a person, room, etc.
 An award that is a token of recognition to the recipient intended for wearing

Other uses
 Cake decorating, the art of making a usually ordinary cake visually interesting 
 Christmas decoration, festive decorations used at Christmas time
 Decorations (John Ireland), a set of three pieces for piano solo composed in 191213 by John Ireland
 Decorator pattern, a design pattern used in object-oriented programming
 In-glaze decoration, a method of decorating ceramics - decoration applied before firing
 On-glaze decoration, a method of decorating ceramics - decoration applied after glazing
 In-mould decoration, a method of decorating moulded plastics
 Interior design, the internal finishing of a building
 Link decoration, the style of visual appearance of hyperlinks
 Name decoration, a technique used in most programming languages
 State decoration, an object such as a medal or insignia that is awarded to certain people
 Syntax decoration, a form of enriched text presentation or syntax highlighting
 Text decoration, text attributation with styles like italics, boldface, underlines
 USB decoration, a decorative device that uses the Universal Serial Bus connector 
 Web decoration, conspicuous silk structure in the webs of some spiders
 Window decoration, in computing are the window's visual elements drawn by a window manager
 Interior decorating, a process by which a person creates an emotionally and intellectually pleasing space for themselves and others to enjoy

See also 
 Decorator (disambiguation)